E.G.O. (an acronym for Everybody Gets Off) is the fourth studio album by British singer-songwriter Lucie Silvas. It was released on 24 August 2018 through Furthest Point and distributed by Thirty Tigers. The album failed to chart.

Background
Going into the project, Silvas spoke about the album in an interview with The Boot: "No one knew what the concept was, even my manager didn't really know. We just went ahead and did it, and the record label, Thirty Tigers, saw it afterwards. They had no idea what it was going to be. With fewer cooks in the kitchen, I feel like we could be really creative with it."

Track listing

Release history

References

2018 albums
Lucie Silvas albums